Rosario Violeta Solís Hernández, better known as Charito Solís (October 6, 1935 – January 9, 1998), was a FAMAS and Gawad Urian Award-winning Filipina film actress, in addition to being the first Philippine woman who have bared her chest in recorded film.

Profile
Rosario Violeta Solís Hernández was born in Manila. At age 19, she was introduced by her uncle, the film director F. H. Constantino to Doña Narcisa de León, the head of LVN Pictures, who cast her to star in her initial movie Niña Bonita, an adaptation of Frank Capra's It Happened One Night. The film was a success, and marked the beginning for Solís of a 43-year career in film that lasted until her death. Solís died on January 9, 1998, in Calamba from cardiac arrest.
She was buried at Manila Memorial Park in Parañaque.

Film career
Solís would star in well over 100 films starting with LVN Pictures' classics such as Niña Bonita (1955), Charito, I Love You! (1956), Walang Sugat (1957), Malvarosa (1958), Kundiman Ng Lahi (1959) and Emily (1960). She was featured in several of the best-known and critically acclaimed movies of Philippine cinema. She played the female lead in the 1962 film adaptation of Jose Rizal's El filibusterismo, directed by Gerardo de Leon.

Among her many films she also appeared in Eddie Romero's Manila, Open City (1967), Araw-Araw, Gabi-Gabi (1975) and Agila (1980); in Mike de Leon's Kisapmata (1981) and Batch 81 (1982); in Ishmael Bernal's City After Dark (1980) and Hinugot sa Langit (1985); in Lino Brocka's Init (1979) and Ina, Kapatid, Anak (1979); and as the narrator in Marilou Diaz-Abaya's Karnal (1983). Other notable performances of Solís were featured in Angustia (1963), Tatlong Mukha Ni Pandora (1963), Magda Sales (1964), Claudia (1966) and Boomerang (1966).

From 1967 to 1971, she was under contract in “Nepomuceno Productions”. Her Eight films for that outfit were Dahil Sa Isang Bulaklak, Ang Langit Sa Lupa, Luha Sa Karimlan, Manila Open City, Igorota, Ang Pulubi, Pipo and The Hunted. Her performance in Dahil Sa Isang Bulaklak earned her the 1967 Asian Best Actress award from the Asian Film Festival held in Tokyo, Japan. Dahil sa... also brought a bonus to Solis: with the film being the country's entry to the Best Foreign Film category at the Academy Awards (the film did not make it to the semi-finals), she and Luis Nepomuceno, the film's producer, were given tickets to see the 40th Academy Awards, the first Filipinos to ever do so.

After her association with Nepomuceno Productions ended, she appeared in several more films such as Shake, Rattle & Roll, Hindi Kami Damong Ligaw (1976), Ms. Teresa Abad Ako Si Bing, Hugasan Mo Ang Aking Kasalanan, Babae Sa Likod Ng Salamin, Beerhouse, Babae Huwag Kang Tukso, Tundo Isla Puting Bato, Babae Ngayon At Kailanman, Walang Katapusang Tag-araw, Mga Tinik Ng Babae, Iwasan Kabaret, Hubad Sa Mundo, Mga Huwad Na Mananayaw, Init, and Alaga.

Solís became the first Filipino actress to play the lead role in an internationally released Japanese movie, in 1961 when she starred in Kenji Misumi's “Shaka”, a film biography on the life of Shakyamuni Buddha. She appeared in another Japanese film The Princess and I produced by Daiei Japan which had its Philippine Premiere in Lyric Theater on Escolta on October 10, 1962. Solís starred in another international production, alongside Tetchie Agbayani and John Saxon in Eddie Romero's Desire (1982).

Awards
Her performance in 1967's Dahil sa Isang Bulaklak, directed by Luis Nepomuceno, won her Best Actress award at the 1967 Asian Film Festival. She again starred for Nepomuceno the following year in Igorota, where she became the first Filipina actress to bare her breasts on film. Her role in Igorota won her the 1968 FAMAS Best Actress Award, one of 5 she would win during her career. Her other four FAMAS Best Actress wins came in 1959 for Kundiman ng Lahi; in 1960 for Emily; in 1963 for Angustia; and in 1983 for Don't Cry for Me, Papa. After her fifth win, in 1984, she became the first actress to be inducted into the FAMAS Hall of Fame. She also won the Gawad Urian Best Actress award in 1979 for Ina, Kapatid, Anak, and for Best Supporting Actress for in 1981 and 1982 for Kisapmata and Karnal, respectively. In 1984, Solís won Best Supporting Actress for her performance as a narrator in Karnal from Philippine Academy of the Philippines (FAP Awards).

In the first-ever Metro Manila Film Festival held in 1975, Solís won the Best Actress Award for Araw Araw, Gabi Gabi and a Best Supporting Actress in the 1981 Metro Manila Film Festival for Kisapmata. She received Ulirang Artista Lifetime Achievement Award from Philippine Movie Press Club (Star Awards) in March 1997.

In the Catholic Mass Media Awards, she was the first lead artist to be awarded the "rock trophy" for an excellent performance as a jealous sister, wife and mother in the family drama, "Ina, Kapatid, Anak". In 1983, she was awarded the best actress rock trophy for playing the role of a manipulative mother in "Minsan May isang Ina".

{| class="wikitable sortable" style="width:70%; text-align:center;"
|+ Gawad Urian Award
|-
! scope="col" style="width:10%;" | Year
! scope="col" style="width:35%;" | Nominated work
! scope="col" style="width:40%;" | Category
! scope="col" style="width:15%;" | Result
|-
| 1986
|  Hinugot sa Langit'
| rowspan=3 align="center"| Best Supporting Actress
| 
|-
| 1984
| Karnal| 
|-
| rowspan=2 align="center"| 1982
| Kisapmata| 
|-
| Playgirl| rowspan=2 align="center"| Best Actress
| 
|-
| 1980
| Ina, Kapatid, Anak| 
|-
|}

{| class="wikitable sortable" style="width:70%; text-align:center;"
|+ Metro Manila Film Festival
|-
! scope="col" style="width:10%;" | Year
! scope="col" style="width:35%;" | Nominated work
! scope="col" style="width:40%;" | Category
! scope="col" style="width:15%;" | Result
|-
| 1981
| Kisapmata'| Best Supporting Actress
| 
|-
| 1975
| Araw-araw, Gabi-gabi| Best Actress
| 
|-
|}

{| class="wikitable sortable" style="width:70%; text-align:center;"
|+ Catholic Mass Media Award
|-
! scope="col" style="width:10%;" | Year
! scope="col" style="width:35%;" | Nominated work
! scope="col" style="width:40%;" | Category
! scope="col" style="width:15%;" | Result
|-
| 1979
| Ina, Kapatid, Anak'| Best Lead Performer
| 
|-
| 1983
| Minsan May isang Ina| Best Actress
| 
|-
|}

Television career
From 1966 to 1968, Solís had a weekly TV show on ABS-CBN entitled The Charito Solís Show (1966 to 1968). In 1973, Solís also had a TV weekly drama show named Obra Maestra on RPN.

In the late 1980s, Solís won the chance to showcase her comedic skills, as well as to gain a younger set of fans, when she was cast opposite Vic Sotto, Alice Dixson and Aiza Seguerra in the sitcom Okay Ka, Fairy Ko!. She played the imperious Ina Magenta, Enteng Kabisote's mother-in-law, a character which was loosely modeled after Agnes Moorehead's  Endora on Bewitched. The popular show lasted nine years and spawned several film adaptations that continued after Solís' death. Giselle Tongi took over the role of Ina Magenta in the Enteng Kabisote movie franchises. Before her death she would star in TV dramas such as Mula Sa Puso and the anthology series The Maricel Drama Special'' starring Maricel Soriano, both shows were transmitted on ABS-CBN.

Filmography

Film

Television

Notes

References

Mercado, Monina (1977). Doña Sisang and Filipino Movies. Philippines: Vera-Reyes, Inc.

External links

KabayanCentral.com Vintage Filipino Movies
The Unofficial Website of the FAMAS Awards

1935 births
1998 deaths
20th-century Filipino actresses
Actresses from Manila
Burials at the Manila Memorial Park – Sucat
Filipino film actresses
Filipino people of Spanish descent
People from Tondo, Manila
People's Television Network
Radio Philippines Network personalities
University of the East alumni